Mae Na Ruea is a village and tambon (subdistrict) of Mueang Phayao District, in Phayao Province, Thailand. In 2005 it had a population of 9072 people.

References

Tambon of Phayao province
Populated places in Phayao province